The Art of Storytelling is the sixth album released by rap group, Dirty. It was released on June 12, 2007 through Rap-a-Lot Records, Asylum Records, Atlantic Records and was produced by Terrence Cash and James Prince. The Art of Storytelling only made it to #40 on the Top R&B/Hip-Hop Albums, becoming their only major studio album to not make it to the Billboard 200. This would mark Dirty's final album with Rap-a-Lot Records as the duo chose to leave label after this album's release.

Track listing
"Set Up"- 4:39  
"Stop Playin'"- 3:30  
"Makin Money"- 4:42  
"Same Old Hood"- 3:52  
"Shut Em Down"- 4:35  
"Chevy Rock"- 4:16  
"Slob on My Nobb"- 1:41  
"I Got 50" (Skit)- 0:37  
"I Got 50"- 4:13 (Featuring Paris) 
"Couple Hundred"- 4:41  
"Just Look at Her"- 3:49  
"Makin Money"- 2:34  
"Ride 4 Me"- 4:56  
"I'm Hood"- 4:33  
"Black Flagg"- 2:22  
"Everybody Shoot"- 3:04  
"Snitcher"- 0:54  
"Rearview Mirror"- 4:05  
"Whoop Em"- 4:45  
"Check Myself"- 5:02  
"Comin Home (Troop Song)"- 4:17

2007 albums
Dirty (group) albums
Rap-A-Lot Records albums